Phelsuma breviceps is a diurnal species of gecko that is native to south-west Madagascar and typically dwells on trees and bushes. Its diet in the wild consists mainly of insects.

Description
This lizard belongs to the smallest day geckos. It can reach a maximum total length of about 10 cm. This species is easily recognised by its short snout, after which it has been named. The basic body colour is light grey to brownish. On the back there are light blue and dark dots and stripes. The legs have light blue spots.

Distribution
This species inhabits south-west Madagascar. It is found in the area around Toliara and near the Tsimanampetsotsa-lake.

Habitat

P. breviceps is adapted to a dry climate. It is often found on the succulent spurge Euphorbia stenoclada which has 7 cm long thorns.

Diet
These day geckos feed on various insects, other invertebrates and nectar, both in the wild and in captivity.

Behaviour
Like most geckos of the genus Phelsuma, this species is quite silent.

Reproduction
The females lay their eggs between the wood spurge thorns.

Care and maintenance in captivity
These animals should be housed in pairs and need a dry terrarium. These animals can be fed with crickets,  wax moth, fruits flies, mealworms, houseflies and fruit baby food.

References

Christenson, Leann and Greg (2003) "Day Geckos In Captivity". Living Art Publishing. 
Henkel, F.-W. and W. Schmidt (1995) Amphibien und Reptilien Madagaskars, der Maskarenen, Seychellen und Komoren. Ulmer Stuttgart. 
McKeown, Sean (1993) The general care and maintenance of day geckos. Advanced Vivarium Systems, Lakeside CA.

Phelsuma
Reptiles described in 1894
Endemic fauna of Madagascar
Reptiles of Africa